The 1975 Australian Grand Prix was a motor race for Australian Formula 1 and Australian Formula 2 racing cars, held on a very wet track at the Surfers Paradise International Raceway in Queensland, Australia on 31 August 1975. It was the fortieth Australian Grand Prix and was also Round 1 of the 1975 Australian Drivers' Championship.

1974 Australian Grand Prix winner Max Stewart won his second AGP ahead of John Leffler and Ray Winter.

Qualifying classification

Race classification

Notes 
Pole position: Bruce Allison - 1'05.8
 Winner's average speed: 144.36 km/h, 89.70 mph
Fastest lap: Max Stewart - 1'17.8 (148.94 km/h, 95.54 mph)

References

External links
 Image of cover of Official Programme, www.progcovers.com
 

Grand Prix
Australian Grand Prix
Formula 5000 race reports
Motorsport at Surfers Paradise International Raceway
Sport on the Gold Coast, Queensland
Australian Grand Prix